Kenneth A. Bingham (born August 3, 1962) is an American politician. He is a former member of the South Carolina House of Representatives from the 89th District, serving from 2001 until 2017. He is a member of the Republican party.

References

Living people
1962 births
Republican Party members of the South Carolina House of Representatives
Politicians from Columbia, South Carolina
21st-century American politicians